Eldon is an unincorporated community and census-designated place (CDP) in Cherokee County, Oklahoma, United States. The population was 368 at the 2010 census, a loss of 62.3 percent from 991 at the 2000 census, due largely to shrinkage of the CDP boundaries. It lies east of Tahlequah at the junction of U.S. Highway 62 and State Highway 51. The Eldon Post Office existed from March 20, 1911, until May 30, 1936. The community is said to have been named for Eldon, Illinois.

Geography
Eldon is located along the eastern edge of Cherokee County at  (35.930319, -94.844083), in the valley of the Baron Fork of the Illinois River. U.S. Route 62 leads west  to Tahlequah and east  to Westville near the Arkansas border. State Highway 51 leads southeast from Eldon  to Stilwell.

Eldon is bordered to the south by the CDP of Welling and to the east by Adair County.

Demographics

As of the census of 2010, there were 368 people residing in Eldon.  The population density was 20 people per square mile (7.7/km2).  There were 155 housing units.  The racial makeup of the CDP was 40.67% White, 0.10% African American, 50.45% Native American, 0.30% from other races, and 8.48% from two or more races. Hispanic or Latino of any race were 0.50% of the population.

There were 136 households, out of which 40.1% had children under the age of 18 living with them, 56.6% were married couples living together, 12.6% had a female householder with no husband present, and 26.1% were non-families. 21.6% of all households were made up of individuals, and 6.4% had someone living alone who was 65 years of age or older. The average household size was 2.78 and the average family size was 3.24.

In the CDP, the population was spread out, with 31.0% under the age of 18, 8.6% from 18 to 24, 30.1% from 25 to 44, 21.2% from 45 to 64, and 9.2% who were 65 years of age or older. The median age was 33 years. For every 100 females, there were 92.1 males. For every 100 females age 18 and over, there were 95.4 males.

The median income for a household in the CDP was $25,086, and the median income for a family was $26,207. Males had a median income of $18,578 versus $19,500 for females. The per capita income for the CDP was $11,125. About 20.6% of families and 25.5% of the population were below the poverty line, including 43.8% of those under age 18 and 18.4% of those age 65 or over.

References

Further reading
Shirk, George H.; Oklahoma Place Names; University of Oklahoma Press; Norman, Oklahoma; 1987: .

Census-designated places in Cherokee County, Oklahoma
Census-designated places in Oklahoma
Cherokee towns in Oklahoma